Matt Gress is an American teacher, politician and Republican member of the Arizona House of Representatives elected to represent District 4 in 2022.

Early career & education
Gress grew up in Oklahoma and graduated from the University of Oklahoma, prior to becoming a public school teacher and school board member. He also received his Masters degree from Syracuse University. He was budget director for Governor Doug Ducey. Gress is openly gay.

Elections
2022 Gress and Democrat Laura Terech won the general election, having defeated former Republican State Representative Maria Syms in the general election.

References

External links
 Biography at Ballotpedia

Republican Party members of the Arizona House of Representatives
Living people
Year of birth missing (living people)
21st-century American politicians
People from Scottsdale, Arizona